The Alvis Three Litre TA 21, is an automobile which was produced by Alvis Cars between 1950 and 1953. It was announced to the British public the day it went on display at the opening of the Geneva Motor Show 16 March 1950.

Reports noted that the larger new three-litre engine was "square" to provide flexibility in top gear and though the front suspension was once again independent it now used coil springs in place of Alvis's previous transverse leaf system. In external appearance the headlamps were now semi-recessed and there were aprons over the rear wheels.

Bodies

The car was available in four-door Saloon and Tickford drophead versions. 302 dropheads were made. The centre section of the body was carried over from the earlier TA 14 with minor changes but the engine and luggage compartments were new and accounted for the extra length. The front doors remained rear hinged. Separate seats were fitted at the front and in the rear was a bench seat with fold down centre armrest. Leather trim was used. The saloon bodies were made for Alvis by Mulliners in Birmingham.

Three litre engine
The 2993 cc engine was new and produced  fitted with a single Solex carburettor and a compression ratio of 7.0:1.  Unusually, the engine incorporated timing gears at the rear of the cylinder block and a 7-bearing crank to increase smoothness.    This was the first appearance of the engine that would power Alvis cars until the manufacturer withdrew from passenger car production in 1967, although modifications, when branded petrol returned to the market and higher octane fuels became available including increased compression ratios, would enable the power output to be progressively raised after 1953 until, fed by three SU carburetters, it reached  in 1965.

Chassis
Suspension was independent at the front using coil springs with leaf springs at the rear.  drum brakes using a Lockheed system were used, the first use of hydraulic operation by Alvis.

Test
The test car cost £1945 including taxes.

Notes

References

Further reading
 
 

TA 21
Cars introduced in 1950
Luxury vehicles